Maksim Perepelitsa is a 1955 comedy film directed by Anatoly Granik. The song "Let's Go" (known in Russian as "V Put") was written for this film.

Synopsis
Maxime Perepelitsa is a cheerful and quick-witted guy from a Ukrainian village, well-known personality in his native town. He has a fantastic ability to invent all sorts of stories and take time off from work. Having received a summons to the army, wishing to "protect" himself against potential rivals, he sends pumpkins to all the guys in the village on behalf of his beloved girl Maroussi – this is a traditional rejection of courtship in Ukraine which ends up causing a stir in the village. The kolkhoz assembly even wants to deprive Perepelitsa of his honorable duty to serve in the Soviet Army, but Maksim gives his word to correct his behavior. In the army he dodges responsibility when trying to avoid the difficulties of service, but here his trick is out of turn and is arrested in the guardhouse. However his flexible character and good-natured personality make him pliable in re-education. Showing himself as smart and having initiative during a training exercise, he gets the rank of junior sergeant, shows true heroism in his native village during the holidays, and Maroussia finally reciprocates his feelings.

Cast
Leonid Bykov as Maksim Perepelitsa
Lyudmila Kostirko as Maroussia, Maksim's bride
Nikolai Yakovchenko as blacksmith Kondrat Perepelitsa, Maksim's father
Aleksandr Borisov as postman Marco Mukha, Kondrat's friend
George Asipenka as Opanas, Kondrat's friend
Basil Fushchych as Stepan Levada, one of Maksim
Taisiya Litvinenko as Vasilinka, Stepan's beloved
Nina Tamarova as Yavdokha, seller of flowers
Vladimir Efimov as Ivan Tverdokhlib, unfortunate groom of Maroussia
Georgy Vitsin as Musiy, pensioner
Alexander Stepanov as Fomin, a lieutenant, a platoon commander
Konstantin Sorokin as Sablin, foreman, deputy commander of a platoon
Alexander Susnin as Vasily Ezhikov, a colleague of Maksim
Sergei Sibel as Samus, colleague Maksim
Radner Muratov as Taskirov, a colleague of Maksim
Paul Usovnichenko as Kupriyanov, a platoon commander (in credits as Kupriyanov, in the film as Vetrov)
 Boris Leskin as Mykola

Production
Anatoly Granik for most of the major roles invited Ukrainian theater actors, as all of the rural scenes of the film took place in Ukraine. The main characters who came to serve in the army are Ukrainians.

In 1955, the film Private Ivan was made featuring a very similar story; author of the script and of the source material Ivan Stadnyuk openly accused the creators of "Private Ivan" in plagiarism.

After watching the movie "Maksim Perepelitsa" the army accused screenwriter Stadnyuk of promoting familiarity in the army. This alleged familiarity was reflected in the scene where the company commander, senior lieutenant Kupriyanov invites Maksim, after he returns from the guardhouse, to sit beside him on the bench and at the same time gives him a cigarette from his own cigarette case.

This film is the first on-screen appearance of the AK-47.

See also
Private Ivan

References

External links

1955 comedy films
1955 films
Russian black-and-white films
Russian comedy films
Soviet black-and-white films
Soviet comedy films
1950s Russian-language films
Ukrainian-language films
Military humor in film
Films set in the 1950s
Films set in Ukraine
Films set in the Soviet Union
Films shot in Saint Petersburg
Films shot in Ukraine
Lenfilm films
1950s multilingual films
Russian multilingual films
Soviet multilingual films